René Courvoisier (June 9, 1907 – January 2, 1989) was a Swiss field hockey player who competed in the 1936 Summer Olympics. In 1936 he was a member of the Swiss team which was eliminated in the group stage of the Olympic tournament. He played two matches as forward.

References

External links
profile

1907 births
1989 deaths
Swiss male field hockey players
Olympic field hockey players of Switzerland
Field hockey players at the 1936 Summer Olympics